Susanna "Sanna" Persson Halapi (born 18 August 1974 in Kävlinge, Sweden) is a Swedish comedian and actress.

Persson began her career as a comedian in a Lund student comedy ensemble. She belonged to the first generation of the female ensemble Boelspexarna and has also participated in several carnivals, including a major role in the carnival film "The Handyman and the Professor" (2002).

In Sweden, she is probably best known from the TV series "HippHipp" (in which she played Lithuanian Jolanta, hostess of "Swedish Celebrity Travels"), "Extra allt" and "Anders och Måns". Together with the actors in the latter programme, Anders Johansson and Måns Nilsson, she has also played dinner shows in Malmö, and hosted the inauguration of Malmö Festival 2005. Sanna performed in the ensemble "Humorkollektivet Ivan Lendl" for a while together with Josephine Johansson and Måns and Anders.

Persson has also played serious roles, including in Jan Troell's "Så vit som en snö", a production of Joyce Carol Oates's play Naked and the docudrama "Hjärtats oro" about Hjalmar Bergman. At New Year 2005/06 Persson appeared in "En sorts nyårskabaré" in Malmö together with Mikael Wiehe and Gonzalo del Rio Saldias. At Christmas 2006, she participated in HippHipp's "Itzhaks julevangelium" advent calendar on SVT, and in autumn 2007 she appeared in the play "Kalla det vad fan du vill" at the Malmö Dramatic Theater.

She married her husband Lars Halapi in 2006.

Selected filmography
1999 - Herr Pendel (en: Mr. Pendel)
2001 - Music for One Apartment and Six Drummers
2001 - Så vit som en snö (en: As White as a snow)
2002 - Hotel Rienne
2002 - Hjärtats oro (en: The Hearts Worry) (TV series)
2002 - Vaktmästaren och professorn (en: The Janitor and the Professor)
2006 - Itzhaks julevangelium (TV series)
2006 - Kvinna vid grammofon (en: Woman Next to the Phonograph)
2007 - Hej rymden! (en: Hello space!) (TV series)
2010 - Vid Vintergatans slut (en: At the End of the Milky Way)  (TV series)
2010 - Sound of Noise
2012 - Mysteriet på Greveholm – Grevens återkomst (en: The Mystery at Greveholm –The Return of the Graf ) (TV series)

References

External links

Internet Movie Database

1974 births
Living people
People from Kävlinge Municipality
Swedish actresses
Swedish comedians